The Hockey Players   is a 1965 Soviet sports drama film written by Yury Trifonov and directed by Raphael Goldin. It had English release in 1965 under the title The Hockey Players, Finnish release as Mestarit, and East German release as Eishockeyspieler.

Plot 
Thirty-year captain of the Rockets hockey team,  Anatoly Duganov (Vyacheslav Shalevich), famous and experienced player decides to fight for the sport longevity of the  old men  as he tries to prove that it is still too early to retire. But in sports, including hockey, for a long time there is a certain stereotype: in 16 years is considered to be more junior player, at 18 years young player in the adult team, and in 25 years,   is already a veteran. Acutely experiencing a quarrel with my girlfriend Maya (Elza Lezhdey), Duganov seeking participation in the decisive final match between the two strongest teams,   and seek victory team.

Cast

 Vyacheslav Shalevich as Anatoly Duganov
 Vladimir Ivashov as  Morozov
 Aleksandr Orlov as Vladimir Vvedensky
 Nikolai Rybnikov as Coach Lashkov
 Gennadi Yukhtin as Peter Kudrichi
 Georgiy Zhzhonov as Coach Sperantov
 Mikhail Gluzsky as Chairman Ilyin 
 Lyusyena Ovchinnikova as Nadia Kudrichi
 Lev Durov as Drunk Fan 
 Viktor Pavlov as Episode
 Jakov Lenz as Grandpa at the Kiosk
 Kir Bulychev as Young Sculptor
 Elza Lezhdey as Maya
 Yevgeny Shutov as Coach Christopher I.
 Claudia Polovikova as Nina
 Nikolai Grabbe as Nikolai Yershov
 Nikolai Ozerov as Commentator
 Yura Grishkin as Young Hockey Player
 Alex Guryshev as Ivan Samsonov
 Yulia Dioshi as Lashkov's Wife
 German Kachin as Obsessive Fan
 Viktor Kolpakov as Press Photographer
 Vasily Neschiplenko as Team Doctor

Reception
Rated 7 out of 10 stars, the film is considered a decent representation of Soviet hockey, and interesting for fans of the sport.

References

External links 
 Ice hockey - Reviews
 Ruskino
 The Hockey Players at the Internet Movie Database
 
 The Hockey Players on ČSFD

Russian ice hockey films
Mosfilm films
Soviet sports drama films
Russian sports drama films
1960s Russian-language films
1960s sports drama films
1965 drama films
1965 films